Stratton Inlet is a body of water in the Qikiqtaaluk Region of Nunavut, Canada.

Location
It lies off the southern coast of Devon Island. Like Hobhouse Inlet, Burnett Inlet, Powell Inlet, and Cuming Inlet, Stratton Inlet is situated between Maxwell Bay and Croker Bay, in the eastern high Arctic, north of Lancaster Sound and Barrow Strait.

History
Evidence of Thule culture has been found here.

References

 Stratton Inlet, Nunavut at Atlas of Canada

Inlets of Qikiqtaaluk Region